The Joint Publications Research Service (JPRS) was a United States government defense-funded organization that was absorbed into the Foreign Broadcast Information Service (FBIS) but its funding and personnel did not transfer.  For all practical purposes it ceased its massive operations (80,000 reports since 1957) in 1970, and gradually wound down to virtually nothing under FBIS by 1997.

According to FBIS, access to current and past JPRS reports is possible via World News Connection.  In 2012, Readex, a division of NewsBank, began releasing its digital edition entitled Joint Publications Research Service (JPRS) Reports, 1957–1994. , access to this material is available through some university libraries.

According to the Imperial War Museum, JPRS was a CIA operation, operating out of the Department of Commerce. JPRS translations were merged with daily reports of the Foreign Broadcast Information Service (FBIS), a CIA organization, in 1995. The FBIS became the Open Source Center (OSC) within the CIA in 2005; the CIA discontinued public access to OSC in 2013.

References

External links
 Readex index of Joint Publications Research Service (JPRS) Reports, 1957-1994
 Guide to JPRS (Joint Publications Research Service) Reports
 Research guide from Harvard's library
 Readex digital edition of Joint Publications Research Service (JPRS) Reports, 1957-1994
 Foreign Broadcast Information Service : History (Part 1: 1941-1947)
Open-source intelligence in the United States
Government agencies established in 1957
Central Intelligence Agency operations